René Benko (born 20 May 1977) is an Austrian real estate, media and retail investor and founder of the Signa Holding. The company is considered Austria's largest privately held real estate conglomerate. Benko is one of the richest Austrians. Numerous controversies have surrounded Benko’s professional career.

Life 
Benko was born in Innsbruck, Tyrol, Austria as the son of a local government employee and nursery schoolteacher and studied at a business school. At the age of 17 he gained his first experience of the real estate sector in a building company owned by an acquaintance.

Benko lives mainly in Innsbruck, Tyrol. He is married for a second time and has four children. Apart from that, little is known about Benko's private life.

Business activities

Foundation and first investments 

At the end of 1999 Benko founded the two-person company Immofina Holding, which was renamed Signa Holding in 2006.

The first projects included the extension of attics into luxury apartments and the profitable purchase and sale of the health hotel Lanserhof in Lans. After these successes, the Viennese entrepreneur Karl Kovarik, who inherited several gas stations, contributed to the first financial jump-start with 25 million euros.

The next steps included the purchase of 16 inner-city properties from the portfolio of BAWAG P.S.K. bank in 2007, as well as the opening of medical centers in Vienna, and the acquisition of the Kaufhaus Tyrol, which was completely renovated between 2007 and 2010. The planning of the latter was carried out by the renowned architect David Chipperfield. In 2008, the former headquarters of Länderbank and Bank Austria became the property of Signa Holding and was converted into the Park Hyatt Vienna hotel. In 2011, the company bought the Oberpollinger department store in Munich. Furthermore, a portfolio of buildings consisting of KaDeWe and Karstadt properties was acquired in 2012. Following these investments, Signa bought the commercial businesses of KaDeWe in 2013, and Karstadt in 2014.

In November 2012, Benko and the tax advisor Michael Passer were found guilty of "attempted prohibited intervention" (bribery) and convicted to a suspended sentence of one year by the Vienna Regional Court. The judge saw the case as a "model of corruption", in which Benko commissioned Passer to contact the former Croatian Prime Minister Ivo Sanader and offered him 150,000 euros to influence a pending Italian court case in Benko's favor. The conviction was confirmed by the Higher Regional Court in 2013 and, following Benko's appeal, by Austria's Supreme Court in 2014. As Benko received a suspended sentence of one year, he is not considered a criminal by Austrian law and does not have a criminal record.

Expansion towards a holding company 
On June 18, 2013, Benko retired from the operational leadership of Signa Holding and took over the chairmanship of the Advisory Board of the Signa Group.

In 2013, the new company division Signa Retail was founded. With the acquisition of the Karstadt department store chain in 2014, as well as several online and multi-channel retailers, Benkos Signa Holding became a significant company in the retail sector. Since 2014, several projects have been completed in Austria and other European countries. Another milestone was the approval of the WaltherPark shopping center in Bolzano in 2016 by a referendum, there have also been further expansions in e-commerce since 2017, such as the acquisition of Probikeshop or hood.de.

After the acquisition of the Austrian furniture chain Kika-Leiner with around 6500 employees in June 2018, negotiations on the acquisition of the department store chain Kaufhof were resumed in July 2018 by Signa Holding under the leadership of René Benko. On September 11, the merger of Karstadt and Kaufhof was officially confirmed. Soon after this merger the public debate around the acquisition and Benko's business practices in general intensified. 

In November 2018, the first investment in the media sector was announced through the acquisition of shares in the Austrian daily newspapers Kronen Zeitung and Kurier by Signa Holding.

In March 2019, Benko's Signa Holding, together with RFR Holding, acquired the Chrysler Building in New York for an estimated amount of $150 million. This is René Benko's first major investment in the United States. A month later, the Technical Commission of the South Tyrol regional government approved the sale of Bolzano Airport to a company owned by Benko, Bolzano entrepreneur Josef Gostner and Strabag founder Hans Peter Haselsteiner.

In mid-2019, Benko's Signa Holding acquired the remaining shares in Galeria Kaufhof. These were held by Canadian retailer Hudson's Bay Company, who thus withdrew from the European market. French investment holding company Société Foncière, Financière et de Participations, which manages the Peugeot family's holdings, acquired a 5% stake in Signa Prime Selection for €186 million. The Hotel Bauer Palazzo on the Grand Canal in Venice was acquired in 2020 by Benko's Signa Group, which is thus expanding its hotel portfolio.

In 2021, Signa acquired the British luxury department stores of Selfridges in a joint venture with Central Group. This will extend their already existing shared portfolio of luxury department stores across European countries. Moreover, Signa Sports United completed its business combination with Yucaipa Acquisition Corporation and started trading on the New York Stock Exchange on December 15, 2021.

Awards 
 2011: Tyrolean of the Year by the Regional Governor Günther Platter
 2012 and 2018: Man of the Year by the Austrian Business Magazine Trend
 2018: Strategist of the Year by the German Business Magazine Handelsblatt; Roland Berger wrote the contribution.
 2018: Man of the Year by Across, a European business magazine for the retail and real estate industries
2019: Pentola d’Oro International by Il Quotidiano Immobiliare, a professional industry journal

References

External links

 Profil at SIGNA Holding company website

1977 births
Austrian real estate businesspeople
Living people
Businesspeople from Innsbruck
Austrian investors
Austrian billionaires
Controversies in Austria